Donatus Magnus, also known as Donatus of Casae Nigrae, became leader of a schismatic sect known as the Donatists in North Africa, Algeria. He is believed to have died in exile around 355.

Life
Little is known of his early life because of the complete loss of his correspondence and written works. He first appears in Church records as Donatus of Casae Nigrae in October 313 when Pope Miltiades found him guilty of re-baptizing clergy who had lapsed and of forming a schism within the Church. Casae was a settlement located on the extreme southern edge of the plains of Numidia, south of Theveste, an area settled by people predominantly of Berber descent.

The Schism
During the wave of persecutions of Christians by the Roman Emperor Diocletian, in order to avoid torture, exile, or death, some Church leaders turned over their scriptures, liturgical books, and other church goods to the imperial authorities. Such people became known as traditors ("surrenderers").

The schism between the two Christian wings centered on the status of traditor clergy. The Donatists contended that traditores could not be reinstated without being re-baptized and re-ordained to take office. They also contended that church rituals performed by traditors were invalid. Therefore,  persons who were baptized, ordained or consecrated should not be recognized by the Church. Donatist thinking was relatively consistent with that of Saint Cyprian, who died a martyr during an earlier wave of persecutions, over half a century earlier.

During the Diocletianic Persecution in Carthage there had been many who were imprisoned, some of whom were voluntary martyrs. These people claimed falsely to be in possession of Church property which they refused to give up to officials. The Bishop of Carthage, Mensurius, who was very much opposed to what he considered the fanaticism of the voluntary martyrs, sent his Archdeacon, Caecilian, to the prison to disperse by force the militant crowds gathered in support of volunteer martyrs. This action by Caecilian created many enemies in Carthage who were staunchly opposed to him.

Upon the death of Bishop Mensurius of Carthage in 311, Caecilian was chosen as his successor. Caecilian was consecrated Bishop of Carthage and Primate of North Africa by Bishop Felix of Aptungi. There were those who believed that Felix was a traditor. Secundus of Tigisis, primate of Numidia, held a council of 70 bishops at Cirta which declared the ordination of Caecilian to be invalid, since it was done by a traditor. Caecilian, who by then held the basilica, did not attend the council, but sent word that if his consecration as bishop was not valid, then let it be done again. At Carthage it was well known that Caecilian was the choice of the people, and it was not believed that Felix of Aptonga had given up the Sacred Books.

The council then determined that Majorinus should be consecrated as bishop. Soon there were many cities with two bishops, one in communion with Caecilian, the other with Majorinus. Majorinus died shortly after, and Donatus was chosen to take his place. Donatus was consecrated in 313 AD as Bishop of Carthage and Primate of North Africa, the leader of the Christian sect which came to be known as the Donatist sect.

The supporters of Donatus appealed to the Emperor, requesting the issue be judged by the bishops of Gaul, since under Constantine's father there had been no persecution in Gaul and therefore no traditors. Instead he referred the matter to Pope Miltiades, himself of Berber descent.

Lateran council
Miltiades summoned Caecilian to the Lateran with ten bishops of his accusers and ten of his own communion. He then called a synod and appointed an additional 15 Italian bishops, as well as three of the chief bishops of Gaul, Reticius of Autun, Maternus of Cologne, and Marinus of Arles.

The Lateran Council was held for three days from 2–4 October 313. The process was modeled on Roman civil proceedings, with Miltiades insisting on strict rules of evidence and argument. The written accusations against Caecilian were disregarded, as being anonymous and unproved. This frustrated the Donatists who left the council without presenting their case, which led Miltiades to rule in favour of Caecilian by default. The council ended after only three sessions. The pope retained Caecilian as bishop of Carthage and condemned Donatus' teachings of rebaptism of bishops and priests.

The Donatists again appealed to the Emperor, who responded by convening the Council of Arles in 314 but it too ruled against the Donatists. The adverse rulings failed to stop the continuing spread of Donatism across North Africa. Around 400 Donatist Bishop Petilianus of Constantine claimed that Miltiades, his successor Sylvester I and others surrendered sacred texts and offered incense to Roman deities.

Aftermath
During his tenure of some 40 years Donatus oversaw the expansion of the Donatist Christian sect but struggled unsuccessfully against the Roman Christian wing to obtain Church recognition as the legitimate Primate of North Africa. This effort failed because the Donatists were unable to prove to a series of the councils that considered the case that Caecilian had been a traditor or that his consecration was invalid because he was consecrated as bishop by a traditor.

The issue was complicated because there it was not only Catholic bishops who were suspected of being traditores; some Donatist bishops were also suspected of the same, in contradiction to their sect's basic teaching. Further, bishops suspected of being traditores refused to be challenged.

Donatus succeeded in expanding the Donatist sect in spite of lack of success in removing Caecilian from office, in large part due to the unpopularity of Caecilian and the Roman administration - particularly amongst the rural population. Donatist priests and bishops were much closer to the rural agricultural population which consisted of Roman farmers and the Berber and Phoenician descendants of the indigenous people who lived there before the Romans conquered North Africa.

Most Donatist clergy in rural Numidia spoke the vernacular languages (Old Libyan and Eastern Berber languages or Punic) as well as Latin, whereas the Catholic clergy usually spoke only Latin.

Donatism after Donatus

In 347 Donatus was exiled to Gaul until his death c. 355. At the time when Donatus' tenure ended, the Donatist Church was the dominant Christian Church in North Africa – but suffered from internal dissensions as well as the actions of the Catholic Church aimed at reincorporating the sect and thus unifying North African Christianity.

The Circumcellions were bands of nomadic anti-Roman rebels, Punic-speaking bandits from the lower strata of society, who supported Donatism and were sometimes led by Donatist clergy. However, they broke out of control, attacking Roman landlords and colonists and redistributing goods. Their support for the Donatists caused the Donatists to be identified with them, leading officials to take punitive action against the Donatist Church.

Further, the Donatist church splintered into two main groups, reducing its effectiveness as a church.

Later theological thought
Protestant historians have noted the parallel between the Donatist debates and Reformation debates that broke out in Europe over a millennium later, leading to the formation of Protestant churches.

See also
 Donatism

References

Sources
Beaver, R. Pierce, “The Donatist Circumcellions”. (Church History, Vol. 4, No.2 June 1935) pp. 123–133.
Edwards, Mark ed. trans. Optatus: Against the Donatists. Liverpool: Liverpool University Press, 1997.
Frend, W. H. C., The Donatist Church. Oxford: Clarendon Press, 1971.
McGrath, Alister E. Reformation Thought, an Introduction. Blackwell Publishing, Third edition: January 1999.
Gaddis, Michael. There Is No Crime for Those Who Have Christ. Berkeley: University of California Press: 2005.  pp. 103 – 130.
Tilley, Maureen A. trans., Donatist Martyr Stories – The Church in Conflict in Roman North Africa. Liverpool: Liverpool University Press: 1996.
Tilley, Maureen A., "Dilatory Donatists or Procrastinating Catholics: The Trial at the Conference of Carthage" (Church History, Vol. 60, No.1 Mar. 1991) pp. 11 – 19.
Donatus & the Donatist Schism. http://www.earlychurch.org.uk/donatism.php

External links
History of the Donatists

355 deaths
4th-century Romans
4th-century bishops of Carthage
Ancient Christians involved in controversies
4th-century Berber people
Berber Christians
Donatists
Year of birth unknown